Douepea is a genus of flowering plants belonging to the family Brassicaceae.

Its native range is western Pakistan.

The genus name of Douepea is in honour of Herman van Donep, a government secretary in Kochi. and it was published in Mém. Soc. Bot. France Vol.8 on page 297 in 1917. It was published in V.Jacquemont, Voy. Inde Vol.4 on page 18 in 1841.

Known species:
Douepea arabica 
Douepea tortuosa

References

Brassicaceae
Brassicaceae genera
Plants described in 1841
Flora of Pakistan